Chayka is a rural locality (a village) in Kozhay-Semyonovsky Selsoviet, Miyakinsky District, Bashkortostan, Russia. The population was 31 as of 2010. There is 1 street.

Geography 
Chayka is located 13 km north of Kirgiz-Miyaki (the district's administrative centre) by road. Alexeyevka is the nearest rural locality.

References 

Rural localities in Miyakinsky District